Quiet Comes the Dawn is a 2019 Russian horror film directed by Pavel Sidorov and starring Aleksandra Drozdova  and Oksana Akinshina.

It was released in Russia on 31 January 2019.

Plot
Svetlana’s brother dies under mysterious circumstances. Extremely vivid nightmares begin to haunt her and she decides to turn to the Institute of somnology for help. She and other patients are induced into a collective lucid dream. But at dawn, they awake to a completely different reality that is more horrifying than any nightmare.

Cast
 Aleksandra Drozdova as Svetlana  
 Kuzma Kotrelev as Anton, Svetlana's brother
 Oksana Akinshina as Maria, Anton's and  Svetlana's mother 
  as Kirill Pavlovsky
 Anna Slyu as Lilya
 Valery Kukhareshin as Stepan Laberin, Professor
 Oleg Vasilkov as Vitaly

Reception
Pavel Sidorov's film received mixed, mostly negative reviews from film critics. One of their main complaints include the illogical and incoherent plot.

References

External links 
 

2019 films
2010s Russian-language films
2019 horror films
Films about sleep disorders
Films about nightmares
Russian horror thriller films